The lesser stripetail scorpion (Chihuahuanus  coahuilae) is a small (35-55mm) species of scorpion found in Mexico and the southwestern United States.

Description

Distribution and habitat
The lesser stripetail scorpion is generally found in Mexico and the U.S. states of Arizona, New Mexico and Texas.

Because it is primarily a burrowing species, they are most easily found by using a black light and can be found under rocks and debris.

Ecology and behavior
This scorpion uses a flick as its mode of defense, but they will occasionally stand their ground with a defensive posture.
The sting is very painful. Sensitivity and pain can last from 15 to 30 minutes or occasionally longer, with no real medical side effects. Minor swelling and edema can be experienced during that time period depending on severity of sting.

References

External links
  Image

Vaejovidae
Animals described in 1968
Scorpions of North America